The 2012 Euro Beach Soccer Cup was held in Moscow. The venue was the Luzhniki Palace of Sports in the Russian capital of Moscow. Eight teams with better results in 2011 come together for this competition, with a one-round knock-out system that took place between February 17–19.

Just like in the 2005 Euro Beach Soccer Cup, the Euro Beach Soccer Cup was hosted in Russia, and the Muscovite climate at that time of the year meant the tournament was held indoors.  Russia, Switzerland, Portugal, Italy, Spain, Romania, Poland, and France were the participating countries.

Participating nations

Matches

All kickoff times are listed as local time in Moscow (UTC+4).

Main Tournament

Quarter finals

Semi finals

Third place

Final

Fifth to eighth place deciding matches
The following matches took place between the losing nations in the quarterfinals to determine the final standings of the nations finishing in fifth to eighth place. The semifinals took place on the same day of the semifinals of the main tournament and the playoffs took place on the day of the final.

All kickoff times are listed as local time in Moscow (UTC+4).

Fifth to eighth place semi finals

Seventh place playoff

Fifth place playoff

Winners

Awards

Top scorers

6 goals
 Madjer
 D. Stankovic
 G. Soria

5 goals
 A. Makarov
 Kuman

3 goals
 D. Shishin
 B. Novo
 P. Palmacci
 D. Baran
 P. Friszkemut
 J. Basquaise

2 goals
 E. Eremeev
 E. Shaykov
 P. Borer
 S. Feudi
 F. Corosiniti
 R. Coimbra
 B. Saganowski
 M. Beiro
 D. Samoun
 L. Croituru

1 goal
 A. Bukhlitskiy
 Lucio
 Jordan
 B. Torres
 S. Meier
 S. Spaccarotella
 M. Jaeggy
 D. Ramacciotti
 S. Marinai
 M. Leghissa
 K. Grzegorczyk
 T. Wydmuszek
 B. Piechnik
 D. Depta
 Pajon
 G. Touchat
 F. Mendy
 A. Barbotti
 Maci
 M. Posteucă
 L. Chirilă

Own goal
 B. Piechnik
 C. Torres
 J. Basquaise

Discipline

Cards issued

Player with most cards

Team with most cards

 Yellow (23)
 Second yellow (1)
 Red (2)

 I. Gândac (3) 
 B. Piechnik (2) 
  J. Basquaise (2) 

 (7)
 (6)
 (5)
 (5)
 (4)

Final standings

References

External links
Beach Soccer Worldwide
Euro Beach Soccer 2012 site
Day 1
Day 1
Day 2
Day 2
Day 3
Day 3

Euro Beach Soccer Cup
2012 in beach soccer